Juliana's golden mole (Neamblysomus julianae) is a golden mole endemic to South Africa. It is listed as an endangered species due to habitat loss and a restricted range. Golden moles are an ancient group of mammals that live mostly below ground. The eponymous Juliana is Juliana Meester, the wife of the South African zoologist who named this species.

Description
They have shiny coats of dense fur and a streamlined, formless appearance. They have no visible eyes or ears; in fact, they are blind - the small eyes are covered with hairy skin. The ears are small and are hidden in the animal's fur. Juliana's golden mole weighs .

Ecology
It is confined to sandy soils, often pockets along weathered rocky ridges of quartzite or granite. It is also common in well-irrigated gardens. Usually two young are born, sometimes one. Golden moles eat invertebrates such as insects, earthworms and snails. Their young are born in a grass-lined cavity in the ground. Golden moles usually dig their tunnels just below the surface of the ground. The main feeding activity is in the late afternoon and at night. They exhibit torpor daily during the morning and early afternoon.

Status
Juliana's golden mole is found in Pretoria (Gauteng), Nylstroom (Limpopo Province) and Kruger National Park (Mpumalanga), South Africa. Where it occurs, Juliana's golden mole can be locally common. However, its occurrence is extremely patchy within its limited geographic range. There are no data on population size. The population on Bronberg Ridge, Pretoria East, is severely affected by ongoing intensive urbanization and a mining operation, and it is considered to be critically endangered. The Nylsvley population in Limpopo occurs in farmlands (adjoining the Nylsvley Nature Reserve) that are subject to habitat alteration and potential degradation. Another threat is habitat fragmentation which causes obstruction to animal movement; this results in in-breeding which increases the possible risk of extinction. The International Union for Conservation of Nature now rates this species as "endangered".

References

External links
 IUCN - case study
ARKive - images and movies of the Juliana's golden-mole (Neamblysomus julianae)

Afrosoricida
Endemic fauna of South Africa
Mammals of South Africa
Endangered fauna of Africa
Mammals described in 1972